Hiroshi Lockheimer (born 1975)  is a Japanese German software engineer and business executive. He is one of the founding members of the Android team at Google, which was created after Google acquired the mobile operating system. At Google, Lockheimer is currently the senior vice president of Android, Chrome, ChromeOS & Play, overseeing the company's range of mobile products.

Early life
Lockheimer, born in 1975, grew up in Tokyo, the son of Japanese and German parents. He lived in Japan until the age of 18. In 1993, Lockheimer moved to the United States to enter Rice University in Houston, Texas. Lockheimer didn't enjoy his time in Texas and dropped out to move back to Tokyo to study programming. Lockheimer returned to the United States in 1997, and three years later became the first employee of Andy Rubin's start-up, called Danger Inc.

Google
Lockheimer was approached by Andy Rubin after Android got acquired by Google. In 2015, Lockheimer described his interaction with Rubin to Fast Company:

He knew my interest in consumer devices, and specifically wireless devices. He called me up and said, ‘Hey, you know, we’re doing this thing at Google now, we got acquired. I can’t really tell you what we’re doing, but I think you’re really going to be excited about it. You should come talk to us'.

Lockheimer joined Google's Android team in April 2006, 19 months before the public unveiling of Android 1.0. Lockheimer initially started as Android's executive director, and was promoted to vice president of engineering in 2011. As of October 2015, Lockheimer is Google's senior vice president of Android, Chrome, ChromeOS & Play.

Career
 Be, Inc., manager, 1997–2000
 Danger, Inc., first employee, 2000–2000.
 Palm, Inc., program manager, 2000–2001.
 Good Technology, engineering manager, 2001–2004.
 Microsoft IPTV, platform manager, 2005–2006.
 Google, executive director, 2006–2011.
 Google, vice president of engineering, 2011–2015.
 Google, senior vice president of Android, Chrome, ChromeOS & Play, 2015–present.

References

1975 births
Businesspeople in software
Google employees
Living people
People from Tokyo
Businesspeople from the San Francisco Bay Area